The Sombrio River is a river in the Capital Regional District of British Columbia, Canada. Located on southern Vancouver Island, it flows to the Strait of Juan de Fuca on the Pacific Ocean at Sombrio Beach.

Natural history
The lower reaches of the river, below British Columbia Highway 14, fall within Juan de Fuca Provincial Park.

Course
It flows southwest, passes under British Columbia Highway 14, flows under a suspension bridge carrying the Juan de Fuca Marine Trail, and ends at the Strait of Juan de Fuca on the Pacific Ocean at Sombrio Beach, north of Sombrio Point and south east of the settlement of Port Renfrew.

References

Rivers of Vancouver Island
Juan de Fuca region